Pernilla Margareta Stephanie Winberg (born 24 February 1989) is a Swedish ice hockey retired forward, who currently serves as a commentator for C More. She scored 282 points across her 9 year SDHL career, winning two SDHL championships. She made over 300 appearances for the Swedish national team, winning a silver medal at the 2006 Winter Olympics.

Career  
She graduated from the University of Minnesota-Duluth in 2013 and played for the Minnesota–Duluth Bulldogs, five-time NCAA Division I national champions.

She missed three and a half weeks of the 2018-19 season due to a concussion, returning just in time for the playoffs.

In October 2019, just 7 games into the season, she suffered a severe concussion, the third in three years, forcing her to miss the rest of the 2019-20 season. A year later, in October 2020, it was announced that she would be starting a position as an expert commentator for C More's coverage of the SDHL.

International 
She won a silver medal at the 2006 Winter Olympics. She scored the game-winning goal in the shootout against the American women in the semi final game, where she was Sweden's youngest national player. She would later become the last remaining player from the silver-medal winning 2006 Swedish Olympic team to retire.

At the 2010 Winter Olympics, Winberg recorded an impressive five goals in the tournament including four against Slovakia and one against the powerhouse USA.

References

External links

1989 births
Living people
Ice hockey players at the 2006 Winter Olympics
Ice hockey players at the 2010 Winter Olympics
Ice hockey players at the 2014 Winter Olympics
Ice hockey players at the 2018 Winter Olympics
Medalists at the 2006 Winter Olympics
Olympic ice hockey players of Sweden
Olympic medalists in ice hockey
Olympic silver medalists for Sweden
Sportspeople from Malmö
Swedish women's ice hockey forwards
Minnesota Duluth Bulldogs women's ice hockey players
Swedish expatriate ice hockey players in the United States
AIK Hockey Dam players
Linköping HC Dam players
Women sports commentators